John Wittenberg (2 October 1939 – 3 November 2005) was an Australian professional rugby league footballer. A front-row forward with the St. George Dragons, he was a representative in the Australian national team in 1966 and from 1968 to 1970 earning six Test caps.

Playing career
Wittenberg was from Wide Bay, Queensland and played for Toowoomba, the Wynnum-Manly Seagulls and in the Central Queensland town of Theodore in the early and mid sixties from which clubs he represented for Queensland and Australia. The Queensland Rugby League attempted to block his transfer to Sydney in 1967 forcing him to sit out the 1967 season and causing him to miss selection for the 1967  Kangaroo Tour.

He played 53 games for the St. George Dragons from 1968 to 1970 representing for New South Wales  and regaining Australian representative selection during that time. Four of his representative caps were at the 1968 World Cup played in Sydney including the World Cup Final victory against France in June 1968.

He died of a heart attack while working on his farming property in Burren Junction west of Wee Waa, New South Wales aged 66. His son, Jeff, played professionally in Australia and England.

References

Sources
 St George Dragons Player History Website  http://www.showroom.com.au/dragons/dragonshistory
 Andrews, Malcolm (2006) The ABC of Rugby League Austn Broadcasting Corpn, Sydney
Queensland representatives at qrl.com.au

1939 births
Australian rugby league players
Wynnum Manly Seagulls players
Australia national rugby league team players
St. George Dragons players
2005 deaths
Queensland rugby league team players
New South Wales rugby league team players
Rugby league props